Timia melanorrhina is a species of ulidiid or picture-winged fly in the genus Timia of the family Ulidiidae.

References

Ulidiidae
Insects described in 1866
Taxa named by Hermann Loew